K C Rosakutty is an Indian politician and an attorney who was the 5th Chairperson of  Women's Commission of Kerala. She was Vice President of Kerala Pradesh Congress Committee. She was a member of the legislative assembly from Sulthan Bathery. She left Indian National Congress on March 22, 2021 and joined Communist Party of India (Marxist).

References

People from Kerala
Indian National Congress politicians from Kerala
Kerala MLAs 1991–1996
Year of birth missing (living people)
Living people